Highway 776 is a provincial highway in the Canadian province of Saskatchewan. It runs from Highway 41 near Ethelton to Highway 23 near Bjorkdale.

Highway 776 also intersects Highway 35 and Highway 681. It passes near Flett Springs, Lipsett, Clemens, South Star, Sylvania, and Bensham.

See also 
Roads in Saskatchewan
Transportation in Saskatchewan

References 

776